Louis J. Ceci (born September 10, 1927) is an American jurist and legislator who served as a justice of the Wisconsin Supreme Court from 1982 to 1993.

Life and career 
The son of Italian immigrants, Ceci was born in New York City, New York. He served in the United States Navy, during World War II. In 1947, Ceci graduated from the Theodore Roosevelt Evening High School in New York City. He graduated from Marquette University, in 1951, and received his law degree from the Marquette University Law School in 1954. Ceci worked as a private practice attorney in Milwaukee until 1958, when he was appointed Milwaukee's principal assistant city attorney; he occupied this position until 1963.

Public office 
In 1964, Ceci was elected as a Republican to the Wisconsin State Assembly. (He had made an unsuccessful bid for an Assembly seat in 1956, losing badly to John R. Meyer). He did not seek reelection in 1966 and was instead the unsuccessful Republican nominee for Wisconsin Attorney General. In 1968, Republican Governor Warren Knowles appointed Ceci to the Milwaukee County Court's traffic branch. Ceci was elected to the position in 1969 and was elected to the Milwaukee County Circuit Court in 1973. As a judge, Ceci clashed at times with Milwaukee County District Attorney E. Michael McCann and with the Milwaukee County Sheriff's Department.

In 1982, Ceci was appointed to the Wisconsin Supreme Court by Governor Lee Sherman Dreyfus; he was elected to a full term in 1984, and retired in September 1993.  At the time of his retirement, Ceci's judicial philosophy was classified as one of the most conservative among the court's justices.

Notes

Lawyers from New York City
Lawyers from Milwaukee
Military personnel from New York City
Marquette University alumni
Marquette University Law School alumni
Wisconsin state court judges
Justices of the Wisconsin Supreme Court
Republican Party members of the Wisconsin State Assembly
1927 births
Living people
Politicians from Milwaukee
American people of Italian descent